Tin Man Ho, Barson (born 5 March 1990 in Hong Kong) is a goalkeeper coach and retired Hong Kong footballer, who played for Hong Kong Premier League club South China as a goalkeeper.

Club career

Early career
Tin Man Ho joined the South China youth academy when he was young. He studied in Carmel Divine Grace Foundation Secondary School for form one to four and then studied in Yan Chai Hospital Tung Chi Ying Memorial Secondary School

During his following secondary school life, in which he played for the school football team. He got the Best Defensive Player and Champion in Hong Kong secondary school level. Also represented Hong Kong for the international level of secondary school football tournament like Asian Secondary School Football Championship, and the champion of Inter-port Secondary School Football Championship. 

He got the MVP of Hong Kong U20 and Nike Cup Champion at 2009.

He was Hong Kong U15 & U17.

Wanchai
Tin on loan to South China's partner, Wanchai in the 2010–11 season. He featured every single game for the club in the first season.

On 18 February 2012, Tin helped the club claim the champions of Hong Kong Junior Challenge Shield after defeating Happy Valley 3–0.

He was in Hong Kong U21.

South China
Tin returned first division club South China after spending two seasons at Wanchai. 

He made his debut for South China in 2012–2013 season. He made several saves to keep his clean sheet and helped the team defeat Biu Chun Rangers. He got the league champion in the first season in South China.

After the season, Tin Man Ho decided continue his university study in City University of Hong Kong. He was transforming from player to coach for South China.

He represented Hong Kong for different international university football tournament like Asian University football tournament in South Korea, and he awarded “The Best Goalkeeper” in China University Football Championship.

Coaching career

South China
In 2015, Tin Man Ho was promoted to goalkeeper coach and player by manager and former Hong Kong National Team Goalkeeper Coach Chu Kwok Kuen. Ex-Ecuador national football team goalkeeper Cristian Mora, who played all matches for Ecuador in 2006 FIFA World Cup, was one of goalkeeper that Tin Man Ho trained in South China.

Guangzhou Evergrande & Nanjing FA
In 2017, after South China, Tin Man Ho was going to Guangzhou Evergrande U17 to be the goalkeepers coach. Due to some policies in Guangzhou Evergrande, Tin Man Ho did not finish the contract signing process, and move to Nanjing FA as U12 Head Coach. Tin Man Ho met the Chairman of Guangzhou Evergrande Football School, Liu Jiangnan, during this period of time.

Benfica Academy China
In 2018, the Ex- Chairman of Guangzhou Evergrande Football School, Liu Jiangnan, invited Tin Man Ho to Benfica Academy, China, as the Head of Goalkeeper Coach.

Shenzhen FC
In 2019, Tin Man Ho joined China Super League - Shenzhen FC, as U19 Goalkeeper Coach. He went to Finland for a new challenge before Shenzhen FC relegation.

City University of Hong Kong
In 2019, Tin Man Ho returned to CityU as an assistant coach in football department.

Wan Chai
In 2020, Tin Man Ho invited to join Wan Chai as Player， Captain and Coach.

Hong Kong Wonderful Football Club
In 2020, Tin Man Ho invited to join HKWFC as Goalkeeper Coach, for Hong Kong Women's Football League.

All Black FC
In late 2020, Tin Man Ho invited to join All Black FC as Goalkeeper Coach, to help the refugees and ethnic minorities getting into Hong Kong's society by football with locals and foreigners.

Qingdao FC - U19 Goalkeeper Coach
In 2021, Tin Man Ho invited to Qingdao.

Fusion FC
In 2021, Tin Man Ho joined Fusion FC in Vancouver, Canada. Fusion FC in British Columbia Soccer Premier League

FC Tigers Vancouver
In 2021, Tin Man Ho joined FC Tigers Vancouver.

Douglas College - Douglas Royals
In 2022, Tin Man Ho invited to Douglas Royals Soccer Team which is representing Douglas College. Assistant coach / Goalkeeper coaching for both Mens & Womens soccer team .

References

External links
 Player profile on SouthCinaFC.com

 Tin Man Ho at HKFA

1990 births
Living people
Association football goalkeepers
Hong Kong footballers
Hong Kong First Division League players
Hong Kong Premier League players
South China AA players
Hong Kong football managers